Razmik Grigoryan (born 11 October 1971) is an Armenian football midfielder. He was a member of the Armenia national team, and has participated in 14 international matches and scored 2 goals since his debut on 15 May 1994 in an away friendly match against the USA. He scored the first official goal for the Armenia national team after independence on 10 May 1995.

Career statistics

International goals

References

External links

1971 births
Living people
Armenian footballers
Armenia international footballers
Armenian expatriate footballers
FC Ararat Yerevan players
PFC CSKA Sofia players
PFC Spartak Varna players
Armenian Premier League players
Armenian expatriate sportspeople in Bulgaria
First Professional Football League (Bulgaria) players
Expatriate footballers in Bulgaria
Association football midfielders